Liza & Huey's Pet Nation is a show which shows different celebrities bringing in their pets. It is hosted by Liza Tarbuck and Huey Morgan, with their dog co-host, Wilf.

The ten-part series is an animal celebration that combines home videos with studio based and on location features with guests including Kathy Burke, Bill Bailey, Neil Morrissey and Sue Perkins.

Episodes 
After the preview show broadcast on 26 March 2010, it was stated by Liza Tarbuck that the show's first series would be broadcast for the following ten weeks.

Segments

Recipes

International showings

External links 

Official webpage

2010 British television series debuts
2010 British television series endings
Sky UK original programming
Television shows about dogs
English-language television shows